Cervin may refer to:
Cervin (surname)
Matterhorn or Mont Cervin, a mountain of the Alps
Refuge Guides du Cervin, a refuge in the Alps
Mount Cervin, a small rocky hill in Antarctica